Tinthia xanthospila is a moth of the family Sesiidae. It is only known from the type specimen, which was collected at Cedar Bay in Queensland, Australia.

The length of the forewings is about 7 mm for males.

External links
Australian Faunal Directory
Classification of the Superfamily Sesioidea (Lepidoptera: Ditrysia)

Moths of Australia
Sesiidae
Moths described in 1919